Events in the year 2020 in Tajikistan.

Incumbents 

 President: Emomali Rahmon
 Prime Minister: Kokhir Rasulzoda

Events

January 
 January 28 – Prosecutor General Yusuf Rakhmon announced the arrest of 113 alleged members of the Muslim Brotherhood.

February 
 February 13 – In response to the spread of COVID-19, 13,000 copies of WHO guidelines and recommendations to reduce the risk of coronavirus infection were printed and distributed to Tajik citizens.

March 
 March 1 – Parliamentary elections were held in the country, with a total of 241 candidates contesting 22 party-list seats and 41 constituency seats. The result was a landside victory for the ruling People's Democratic Party, which won 47 of the 63 seats. The only opposition party, the Social Democratic Party, received just 0.3% of the vote while the Islamic Renaissance Party of Tajikistan was unable to participate, having been banned by the authorities over terrorism allegations in 2015.

April 
 April 13 – The country reported its first confirmed cases of COVID-19. Five people have tested positive for the virus in the capital Dushanbe, and 10 others in the northern Sughd Region, according to the state-run news agency Khovar.

Deaths

See also 
 List of years in Tajikistan
 2020 in Tajikistan
 2020 in Tajikistani sport

References

External links
 

 
2020s in Tajikistan
Years of the 21st century in Tajikistan
Tajikistan
Tajikistan